Tony Bennett at Carnegie Hall is a 1962 live album by Tony Bennett. The June 9th concert was directed by Arthur Penn and Gene Saks. Carnegie Hall had not featured a pop performer until April 23, 1961 when Judy Garland recorded her legendary concert.

Track listing

1962 12" LP, Tony Bennett at Carnegie Hall

Side one
"Lullaby of Broadway" (Al Dubin, Harry Warren) - 2:10
"Just in Time" (Betty Comden, Adolph Green, Jule Styne) - 2:08
"All the Things You Are" (Oscar Hammerstein II, Jerome Kern) - 3:04
"Stranger in Paradise" (Alexander Borodin, Robert Wright, George Forrest) - 3:12
"Our Love Is Here to Stay" (George Gershwin, Ira Gershwin) - 2:09
"Climb Ev'ry Mountain" (Hammerstein, Richard Rodgers) - 2:09
"Ol' Man River" (Hammerstein, Kern) - 2:49

Side two
"It Amazes Me" (Cy Coleman, Carolyn Leigh) - 3:18
"Firefly" (Coleman, Leigh) - 1:03
"I Left My Heart in San Francisco" (George Cory, Douglas Cross) - 2:46
"How About You?" (Ralph Freed, Burton Lane) - 1:17
"April in Paris" (Vernon Duke, Yip Harburg) - 1:13
"(In My) Solitude" (Eddie DeLange, Duke Ellington, Irving Mills) - 3:29
"I'm Just a Lucky So-and-So" (Mack David, Ellington) - 2:29

Side three
"Always" (Irving Berlin) - 1:34
"Anything Goes" (Cole Porter) - 1:30
"Blue Velvet" (Lee Morris, Bernie Wayne) - 2:37
"Rags to Riches" (Richard Adler, Jerry Ross) - 1:08
"Because of You" (Arthur Hammerstein, Dudley Wilkinson) - 1:40
"What Good Does It Do" (Harold Arlen, Harburg) - 3:54
"Lost in the Stars" (Maxwell Anderson, Kurt Weill) - 3:29
"One for My Baby (And One More for the Road)" (Arlen, Johnny Mercer) - 2:24

Side four
"Lazy Afternoon" (John Latouche, Jerome Moross) - 2:43
"Sing You Sinners" (Sam Coslow, W. Frank Harling) - 1:30
"Love, Look Away" (O. Hammerstein, Rodgers) - 2:23
"Sometimes I'm Happy (Sometimes I'm Blue)" (Irving Caesar, Clifford Grey, Vincent Youmans) - 2:26
"My Heart Tells Me (Should I Believe My Heart?)" (Gordon, Warren) - 2:23
"De Glory Road" (Clement Wood, Jacques Wolfe) - 8:51

1997 CD, Tony Bennett at Carnegie Hall: Complete

Disc one
Introduction/"Lullaby of Broadway" (Al Dubin, Harry Warren) - 2:20
"Just in Time" (Betty Comden, Adolph Green, Jule Styne) - 2:12  
"All the Things You Are" (Oscar Hammerstein II, Jerome Kern) - 3:08
"Fascinating Rhythm" (George Gershwin, Ira Gershwin) - 1:21
"Stranger in Paradise" (Alexander Borodin, Robert Wright, George Forrest) - 3:18
"Our Love Is Here to Stay" (G. Gershwin, I. Gershwin) - 2:14
"Love Look Away" (Hammerstein, Rodgers) - 2:30
"Climb Ev'ry Mountain" (Hammerstein, Richard Rodgers) - 2:12
"Put on a Happy Face"/"Comes Once in a Lifetime" (Lee Adams, Charles Strouse)/(Comden, Green, Styne) - 2:09
"My Ship" (Kurt Weill, I. Gershwin) - 2:36
"Speak Low" (Weill, Ogden Nash) - 2:02
"Lost in the Stars" (Maxwell Anderson, Weill) - 3:34
"Always" (Irving Berlin) - 1:46
"Anything Goes" (Cole Porter) - 1:29
"Ol' Man River" (Hammerstein, Kern) - 2:59
"Lazy Afternoon" (John Latouche, Jerome Moross) - 2:34
"Sometimes I'm Happy (Sometimes I'm Blue)" (Irving Caesar, Clifford Grey, Vincent Youmans) - 2:28
"Have I Told You Lately?" (Harold Rome) - 3:02
"That Old Black Magic" (Harold Arlen, Johnny Mercer) - 1:25
"A Sleepin' Bee" (Arlen, Truman Capote) - 2:58
"I've Got the World on a String" (Arlen, Ted Koehler) - 3:03
"What Good Does It Do" (Arlen, Yip Harburg) - 3:56
"One for My Baby (And One More for the Road)" (Arlen, Mercer) - 2:33

Disc two
"This Could Be the Start of Something" (Steve Allen) - 1:35
"Without a Song" (Vincent Youmans, Billy Rose, Edward Eliscu) - 3:03
"Toot Toot Tootsie (Goodbye)" (Gus Kahn, Ernie Erdman, Dan Russo) - 2:01
"It Amazes Me" (Cy Coleman, Carolyn Leigh) - 3:02
"Rules of the Road" (Coleman, Leigh) - 2:25
"Firefly" (Coleman, Leigh) - 1:11
"The Best Is Yet to Come" (Coleman, Leigh) - 2:39
"I Left My Heart in San Francisco" (George Cory, Douglas Cross) - 2:55
"How About You?"/"April in Paris" (Ralph Freed, Burton Lane)/(Vernon Duke, Harburg) - 2:35
"Chicago (That Toddlin' Town)" (Fred Fisher) - 1:24
"(In My) Solitude" (Eddie DeLange, Duke Ellington, Irving Mills) - 3:36
"I'm Just a Lucky So-and-So" (Mack David, Ellington) - 2:36
"Taking a Chance on Love" (Vernon Duke, Ted Fetter, John La Touche) - 1:56
"My Heart Tells Me (Should I Believe My Heart?)" (Gordon, Warren) - 2:23
"Pennies from Heaven" (Arthur Johnston, Johnny Burke) - 2:17
"Rags to Riches" (Richard Adler, Jerry Ross) - 1:12
"Blue Velvet" (Lee Morris, Bernie Wayne) - 2:44
"Smile" (Charles Chaplin, Geoffrey Claremont Parsons, John Turner) - 1:23
"Because of You" (Arthur Hammerstein, Dudley Wilkinson) - 1:42
"Sing You Sinners" (Sam Coslow, W. Frank Harling) - 2:01
"De Glory Road" (Clement Wood, Jacques Wolfe) - 8:43

Personnel
Tony Bennett - vocals

Ralph Sharon orchestra:
Ralph Sharon - piano
Kenny Burrell - guitar
Mel Davis, Bernie Glow, Al DeRisi, Nick Travis - trumpet
Jack Lesburg - double bass
Sy Berger, Frank Rehak - trombone
Paul Faulise - bass trombone
Sol Schlinger - bass clarinet, baritone saxophone
Al Cohn - tenor saxophone
Joe Soldo, Dick Meldonian - flute, alto saxophone
Romeo Penque - flute, tenor saxophone
Alfred Brown - viola
Anthony Sophos - cello
Bobby Rosengarden - percussion, bongos, conga, timbales, timpani
Candido Camero - bongos, conga
Eddie Costa - vibes
Billy Exner - drums

Notes

1962 live albums
Albums recorded at Carnegie Hall
Columbia Records live albums
Tony Bennett live albums